Beaumont-Hamel is a commune in the Somme department in Hauts-de-France in northern France.

During the First World War, Beaumont-Hamel was close to the front line, near many attacks, especially during the Battle of the Somme, one of the largest allied offensives of the war. By 1918, the village had been almost totally destroyed.

The banks of white chalk at Beaumont Hamel led to a sector of British trenches being nicknamed "White City". To the west of the village was Hawthorn Ridge Redoubt, one of the sites of the mines exploded on the first day of the Battle of the Somme. On 1 July 1916, the 29th Division assaulted the German front line in an attempt to capture the village as part of the Somme Offensive. Included in this Division was the Newfoundland Regiment. Newfoundland commemorates this event as Memorial Day on 1 July each year.

Notable sights
As there was heavy fighting in this area during the Great War, there are many cemeteries and monuments, among which:
 A number of British cemeteries (among which Beaumont-Hamel British Cemetery)
 Beaumont-Hamel Newfoundland Memorial. One of only two National Historic Sites of Canada outside Canada (the other being the Canadian National Vimy Memorial) and includes three British Cemeteries (Y Ravine Cemetery, Hawthorn Ridge Cemetery No. 2 and Hunter's Cemetery) as well as the Scottish Monument and a memorial to the 29th division (of which the Newfoundland Regiment was a part).
 Hawthorn Ridge Crater

References

External links
 Beaumont-Hamel Newfoundland Memorial on the Veteran Affairs Canada website

Communes of Somme (department)
Battle of the Somme